In 2015, the Indian national cricket team reached the semifinal of the 2015 Cricket World Cup where Virat Kohli and Ravichandran Ashwin plays a massive role.

Cricket World Cup Australia/New Zealand
India participated in ICC Cricket World Cup 2015 hosted by Australia and New Zealand.

 Interesting facts about 
  beat  for the sixth time in row in ICC Cricket World Cup and maintained winning streak by taking 6-0 lead which started from 1992 Cricket World Cup. Till this edition of Men's ODI World Cup  has never beaten  in ICC Cricket World Cup.
 After losing three times (1992, 1999, 2011) against ,  finally got a win against  in ICC Cricket World Cup.
  was unbeaten until the defeat against  in semis.

|}

India won 2–0 on aggregate and advanced to the second round.

Second round

 Draws were taken out on 14 April 2015 and matches began on 11 June 2015. There were forty teams divided in eight groups of five teams each, with India assigned to Group D. Of the six matches played by India during 2015, India won 1 and lost 5.

Events

January
 28 December-14  – 11 January-15: Matches of XXXVI Indian Federation Cup will be scheduled.
 5 January - 11 January: Chennai Open is scheduled.
XXXVI Indian Federation Cup Final scheduled at Jawaharlal Nehru, Madgaon.
 20 January - 25 January: II Indian Open Grand Prix Gold is scheduled at Babu Banarasi Das Indoor Stadium in Lucknow.
 17 January: VIII I-League season begins.
 22 January: III HIL season will begin.
 31 January - 14 February: XXXV National Games will be held in Thiruvananthapuram in Kerala.

February
 22 February: III HIL season final. Hero HIL ended. Ranchi Rays won the final by beating Jaypee Punjab Warriors in 3-2 penalty shootout after score were leveled 2-2.

March
 10 March - 14 March: 2015 Indian Open Snooker is scheduled in Grand Hyatt Hotel, Mumbai. Michael White of  Wales was the winner.
 12 March: 80th Ranji Trophy season will end.  beat  2-0 in the first leg of AFC FIFA World Cup Qualification for 2018 FIFA World Cup, Russia.

April
 8 April: VIII IPL season will begin.

May
 18 May: VIII I-League season end.
 24 May: VIII IPL season final. Pepsi IPL season ends.

September
 II ISL will kick off.
 Ten Pin Bowling League will be held.

December
 II ISL will end.

Unknown
 Indian Open Golf may take place.
 2015 FIBA Asia Under-16 Championship is scheduled in Bangalore.
 XI SAFF Championship will take place in September or December.

Major National Leagues

 Uncertain to take place
 Champions Tennis League - Second season may take place.
 Indian Badminton League - Second season may take place in June.
 Pro Kabaddi League - Second season may take place in July.
 World Kabaddi League - Second season may take place.

References